The Municipality of Šempeter-Vrtojba ( or ;) is a municipality in Slovenia. The municipality comprises the town and municipal seat of Šempeter pri Gorici and the adjacent village of Vrtojba.

History
Both settlements used to be suburbs of town of Gorizia until 1947, when they become part of Yugoslavia while Gorizia remained a part of Italy. They have had a separate urban development since then. Nowadays, the Municipality of Šempeter-Vrtojba forms a single continuous urban area with the neighbouring towns of Nova Gorica and Gorizia. Since May 2011, these three municipalities have been joined in a common trans-border metropolitan zone, administered by a joint administration board.

References

External links
 
 Municipality of Šempeter-Vrtojba on Geopedia

 
Sempeter-Vrtojba
1998 establishments in Slovenia